Acianthera verecunda is a species of orchid plant native to Costa Rica, Ecuador, Guatemala, Nicaragua, and Panama.

References 

verecunda
Flora of Panama
Flora of Costa Rica
Flora of Ecuador
Flora of Guatemala
Flora of Nicaragua